Pravaya Khava is a rural locality (a selo) and the administrative center of Pravokhavskoye Rural Settlement, Verkhnekhavsky District, Voronezh Oblast, Russia. The population was 563 as of 2010. There are 7 streets.

Geography 
Pravaya Khava is located 19 km southwest of Verkhnyaya Khava (the district's administrative centre) by road. Ilyinovka is the nearest rural locality.

References 

Rural localities in Verkhnekhavsky District